Derbyshire County Cricket Club in 1885 was the cricket season when the English club Derbyshire had been playing for fourteen years. They won three first class matches out of eleven.

1885 season

Derbyshire played ten county matches, two each against Hampshire, Lancashire, Nottinghamshire, Surrey and   Yorkshire and one against MCC. 
Edmund Maynard  was in his first season as captain. Frank Sugg was top scorer. William Cropper and Frank Shacklock shared most wickets with 35 each.  
  
William Eadie who made his debut in the season went on to play regularly for the club until 1899. Edwin Coup also made his debut and played several games over three seasons. Francis Dixon and Thomas Selby each played their one career match for Derbyshire during the season.

Derbyshire lost their two leading bowlers in the season. William Mycroft had joined in 1873 and had chalked up impressive bowling figures with his fast left arm action. Frank Shacklock had joined Derbyshire in the 1884 season and also achieved impressive figures, but returned to Nottinghamshire for the 1886 season.  James Stubbings who had joined in 1880 played his last first class game in the season although he continued to appear for Derbyshire in non first class matches.

Matches

Statistics

First-class batting averages

W Mycroft played several games for MCC. Chatterton played two matches for scratch sides against the Australians.

(a) Figures adjusted for non Derbyshire matches

First-class bowling averages

Wicket keeping
James Disney Catches 18 Stumping 2

See also
Derbyshire County Cricket Club seasons
1885 English cricket season

References

}

1885 in English cricket
Derbyshire County Cricket Club seasons
English cricket seasons in the 19th century